Yu Dan may refer to:

Yu Dan (academic) (born 1965), Chinese academic
Yu Dan (sport shooter) (born 1987),  Chinese sports shooter